Halangoda is a village in Sri Lanka. It is located within Central Province. It is a small village with an estimated population of 1300 to date. The population has been steadily declining, and within the last 15 years has declined by an estimated 27%. It is a small and isolated village, and there is very little information available on the community.

See also
List of towns in Central Province, Sri Lanka

External links

Populated places in Matale District